Ryan Clark (born 1 August 1997) is a Scottish footballer who plays as a midfielder for Cumbernauld United.

Career
Clark began his career at Dumbarton. He was first called up for a Scottish Championship game against Queen of the South on 25 April 2015, replacing Mitch Megginson for the final 14 minutes of a 2–1 away defeat. A week later, in the final game of the season, he played the final two minutes of a 2–2 home draw with Raith Rovers in place of Mark Gilhaney.

He suffered a leg break in a pre-season U20s match against Cumbernauld Colts in August 2015, and joined Arthurlie on loan in January 2016 after recovering.

He signed his first professional deal with the club in July 2016 before joining Kilwinning Rangers on loan in August. Clark joined Cumbernauld United in January 2019.

References

External links

1997 births
Living people
Scottish footballers
Association football midfielders
Dumbarton F.C. players
Arthurlie F.C. players
Kilwinning Rangers F.C. players
Scottish Professional Football League players
Cumbernauld United F.C. players